Francis Calley Gray (September 19, 1790 – December 29, 1856) was a politician from Massachusetts. The son of Elizabeth and William Gray, he graduated Harvard University (1809) and went on to be John Quincy Adams's private secretary, a member of the Massachusetts House of Representatives, and president of the Boston Athenæum.  Gray was elected a Fellow of the American Academy of Arts and Sciences in 1819, and a member of the American Antiquarian Society in 1820. When he died, he left many gifts to Harvard, including his collection of 3,000 engravings and $50,000 (equivalent to $ today) to be put towards a museum of comparative zoology.

He died in 1856 and is buried at Mount Auburn Cemetery, his tomb guarded by a sleeping dog.

References

1790 births
1856 deaths
Fellows of the American Academy of Arts and Sciences
Harvard University alumni
Members of the Massachusetts House of Representatives
Members of the American Antiquarian Society
19th-century American politicians
Burials at Mount Auburn Cemetery